The following is a list of fiction employing parallel universes or alternate realities.

Literature 

 Nayantara Ghosh Indian Writer, Poet, Tennis Player, wrote Ayame's Parallel Universe, a story about a Japanese high school student, Ayame Takahashi, who awoke in a parallel universe. While there, she witnessed flowers growing 7-feet tall, cat elections, dog's mooing and many more peculiar incidents.
 Margaret Cavendish, Duchess of Newcastle, wrote The Blazing World (1666), a book far ahead of its time, in which the heroine passes through a portal near the North Pole to a world with different stars in the sky and talking animals.
 Ludvig Holberg, Danish-Norwegian author, historian, and philosopher wrote Niels Klim's Underground Travels (in Latin as Nicolai Klimii iter subterraneum, 1741). The hero Niels Klim slips into a cave and reaches Nazar, a planet inside the hollow Earth, where societies and beings represent satirical comments to existing contemporary ones.
 Edwin Abbott Abbott, mathematician and theologian, wrote Flatland (1884), also known as Flatland: A Romance of Many Dimensions. It recounts the story of a two-dimensional world inhabited by living geometric figures: triangles, squares, circles, etc., and explores concepts of other dimensions (or universes) including Portland, Lineland, and Spaceland. A feature film adaptation of this novella was made in 2007, called Flatland.
 H. G. Wells wrote what is apparently the first explicit para time novel, Men Like Gods (1923), complete with multiverse theory and a paratime machine.
 Murray Leinster's story "Sidewise in Time" (1934), showing different parts of the Earth somehow occupied by different parallel universes, was influential in science fiction.
 Olaf Stapledon's Star Maker from 1937 describes God (called the Star Maker) evolving by creating many cosmoses, each one more complex than the previous.
In C. S. Lewis classic Chronicles of Narnia series (1950–1956) children come and go between our world and Narnia, a land populated by talking animals. In The Magician's Nephew the Wood between the Worlds gives access to several worlds. In The Last Battle it transpires that all the worlds are joined together by a form of heaven.
 Ward Moores Bring the Jubilee  describes the Confederacy winning the American Civil War. This 1953 novel was well received and influenced Philip K. Dicks The Man in the High Castle.
 Andre Norton'''s The Crossroads of Time is a science-fiction novel written by Andre Norton and first published in 1956 by Ace Books. The story takes its protagonist through several versions of Earth as it might have been if history had gone a little differently. The book has been translated into Spanish, Italian, and German. Tacitly postulating a kind of two-dimensional time, Norton anticipated Hugh Everett III's many-worlds interpretation of the quantum theory by one year. She called it the "possible worlds" theory of history.
 Philip K. Dick's The Man in the High Castle (1962) is an alternate history novel.
In The Man Who Folded Himself (1973) by David Gerrold, paradoxes caused by time travel result in the creation of multiple universes.
 Piers Anthony wrote the "Of Man and Manta" series (Omnivore, Orn, and Ox, 1968–76) in which a group of three scientists explores worlds in parallel universes.
 Tonke Dragt's novel "The Towers of February" (De torens van February, 1973) is a coming-of-age novel in diary form for young adults, about a boy who slowly discovers that his memory loss is due to having passed into a parallel universe. The difficulty to travel between both worlds can be seen as symbolic for reaching adulthood and can be taken literally at the same time.
 Michael Coney Charisma 1975 A murder mystery which involves the main character John Maine traveling to different parallel worlds, but the only worlds he can travel to are the ones in which his 'other self' is dead.
 Michael Ende's novel The Neverending Story (Die unendliche Geschichte, 1979) is a portal-story where the deterioration of fantasy (and of lies) among humans of Earth both influences (and stem from) what happens in the magical world of Fantastica. The protagonist reads the story of this world in a book until he understands that he may take part in and save it, and eventually the imagination of Earth.
 David Brin wrote The Practice Effect (1984), which is the story of a scientific researcher who finds himself stranded in an alternate dimension that has unique natural laws that allow objects to become improved as they are used, rather than degrade.
 Terry Pratchett and Stephen Baxter wrote The Long Earth (2012), the first of a series of novels about a (possibly infinite) series of parallel worlds that are similar to Earth.
 H. Beam Piper, the author of the Paratime series, wrote several stories dealing with alternate realities based on points of divergence far in the past. The stories are usually written from the perspective of a law-enforcement outfit from a parallel reality which is charged to protect the secret of temporal transposition.
 "Convolutions", a novella by Vashti Daise, gradually reveals that the two main teenage characters exist in overlapping universes, and when they discover a paradise-like third universe, they can't help but be tempted to escape the struggles of their worlds.
 Fredric Brown's What Mad Universe recounts the adventures of a science-fiction editor of the late 1940s who is thrown into a parallel universe that reflects the fantasies of his most annoying letter-to-the-editor writer (an adolescent male, naturally).
 Isaac Asimov's novel The Gods Themselves depicts scientists in our universe who find a way to "import" matter from another universe, with unforeseen consequences. "The End of Eternity" by Asimov deals with interactions between many timelines or universes that are the result of continuous new alterations a single timeline by external temporal manipulators called the eternals; these many universes and timelines therefore do not exist simultaneously.
 K. A. Applegate's series, Everworld (1999–2001): Several teenagers travel into a parallel world occupied by the mythological beings of Earth.
 Brandon Mull's series, Beyonders (2011-2013): Depicts the multiverse as being divided into an enormous set of "normal" universes, including ours (the beyond), and one intelligently created universe set apart from all others (Lyrian). It's strongly implied in the novels that it's only possible to travel from the "beyond" to Lyrian, or from Lyrian to the beyond.
Gretchen McNeil's novel 3:59 follows the story of Josie, a girl who keeps having dreams about her doppelganger Jo at exactly 3:59 each night. She soon discovers the two live in parallel universes and get the chance to switch places.
 Stephen King's series The Dark Tower has doors that send travelers to different parallel Earths, or, as termed in the story, different levels of the Tower. King also frequently utilizes this idea in other stories, such as The Mist, From A Buick 8, The Talisman, Black House and Insomnia.
 Robert A. Heinlein's novel The Number of the Beast is focused around a 'time machine' that also proves to be able to travel sideways and other directions in time, allowing for crossing into other realities, even ones previously considered fictional by the protagonists.
 S. M. Stirling's novel Conquistador is based on travel between parallel universes, with a group of 20th century Americans having found a means to secretly colonize a world where civilization never advanced past the classical era.Globus Cassus is a book describing a utopian project for a universe contrary to ours, it describes an antipode to the 'real' world.The Wheel of Time by Robert Jordan series the world of dreams, and the Mirror Worlds which represent what could have been had various events in history happened in different ways.
 The Difference Engine (1990) by William Gibson and Bruce Sterling is widely regarded as a book that helped establish the genre conventions of steampunk. It posits a Victorian era Britain in which great technological and social change has occurred after entrepreneurial inventor Charles Babbage succeeds in building a mechanical computer.
 Diana Wynne Jones' Chrestomanci series revolves around the duty of the Chrestomanci to regulate magic in the twelve related worlds. These worlds have alternate histories, in which some people may exist only in a few worlds. Other works of Jones' that include parallel universes: The Magid series; Deep Secret and The Merlin Conspiracy in which the multiverse is shaped like an infinity sign and contains Ayewards and Naywards. The Derkholm series: Dark Lord of Derkholm and its sequel Year of the Griffin in which Pilgrims come from a parallel world for Mr. Chesney's offworld tours. In Howl's Moving Castle, though it does not play a major part in the plot, the wizard Howl is actually from our world. In A Tale of Time City, the main character, Vivian, is kidnapped and taken to Time City, a city out of time and space. Along with her new friends and past kidnappers Jonathan and Sam, she hunts through time and space for the polarites that are gradually being stolen. In A Sudden Wild Magic a group of benevolent witches set out to stop the magicians of Arth who steal ideas, technology, and innovations from Earth. In Hexwood, the machine Bannus sucks potential Reigners from all over the universe into the Wood. In The Homeward Bounders Jamie is made into a Homeward Bounder by "Them" which means he must constantly travel from world to world until he finds his home again.
 John DeChancie's Castle Perilous series tells of a huge magical castle containing portals to 144,000 worlds, including Earth.
 Stephen R. Donaldson's Mordant's Need series, which includes The Mirror of Her Dreams and A Man Rides Through, follows a heroine who can pass into another world through mirrors.
In The Chronicles of Thomas Covenant series, also by Stephen R. Donaldson, main character Thomas Covenant is transported to another world called The Land. Each time he travels to The Land corresponds to an injury in the real world that leaves him unconscious.
 Philip Pullman's His Dark Materials series (1995–2000) deals with two children who wander through multiple worlds, opening and closing windows between them. The final book elaborates the same idea (as C.S. Lewis') that all the worlds share a common heaven, and in this case, underworld.
 Jasper Fforde's Thursday Next series is set in a parallel universe which is very similar to ours but has (amusingly) different history. For example, Britain and Russia are still fighting the Crimean War in 1985. As the story develops, the world of fiction also emerges as another parallel universe and the characters learn how to move between them.
The German series Perry Rhodan sometimes deals with parallel universes and "pararealities."  Each universe has a "strangeness" value that indicates to what extent its physical laws differ from those of our universe. Travel to another universe results in a "strangeness shock" that can disable electronics and leave intelligent beings unconscious for some time.
In L. Neil Smith's The Probability Broach series of novels, characters from different universes end up in a universe in which American history took a different turn in the aftermath of the Revolution, with Albert Gallatin assisting the western Pennsylvania farmers of the Whiskey Rebellion, which culminates in George Washington's execution and the rise of a libertarian republic under a revised Articles of Confederation.
In James P. Hogan's Paths to Otherwhere (1996), scientists at the Los Alamos Laboratory create a machine QUADAR which allow them to swap conscious with people in parallel universes. They explore various parallel universes.
In Kia Asamiya's manga novel Space Battleship Nadesico, written alongside the series Martian Successor Nadesico but altering severely as the course of the story runs, the Jupiterians that are attacking Earth come from a parallel universe, the portal of which is in the red storm visible on Jupiter as a red spot. In their world, Japan won World War II, and because of their strong religious Shinto beliefs, their Gods did not die out, and they were able to use this magic to help strengthen their technology. However, their star died out prematurely, and so they have come to Earth to steal the energy from the Sun to save their world.
 Neil Gaiman's novella Coraline deals with a parallel universe called the "Other World" in which Coraline's surroundings are the same but the people who are supposed to be her parents are actually evil impostors. The novella spawned a film of the same name that deals with the same plot and use of parallel universes.
 Sergey Lukyanenko's novel Rough Draft (2005) takes place across the multiverse of at least 22 worlds (it was implied that there were actually more worlds that haven't been discovered yet) linked together by a series of tower-like transfer points.I, Q is a 2000 Star Trek novel by Peter David and John de Lancie in which God attempts to destroy the multiverse in a large multi-universe maelstrom which the protagonists attempt to stop from within a newly created universe caused by the maelstrom.
In Robert J Sawyer's Neanderthal Parallax series (2003) a parallel historical universe exists in which it was Neanderthals not Homo sapiens who survived to become the dominant species. In a quantum physics experiment gone wrong a Neanderthal scientist is accidentally transported into the universe of Homo sapiens.
 Michael Lawrence's The Aldous Lexicon (2005–2007), comprising A Crack in the Line, Small Eternities and The Underwood See, concerns comings and goings between initially two, later many parallel realities.
In Mirror Dreams (2002) and Mirror Wakes (2003) by Catherine Webb, there are mirror universes, one a magical universe where technology barely works, the other a scientific universe where magic barely works. The inhabitants can physically visit each other's worlds in dreams.
In the Stravaganza series by Mary Hoffman various people travel between present-day England and an alternative, somewhat magical Renaissance Italy called Talia.
In the Alastair Reynolds novel Absolution Gap, (2003) a race called the "Shadows" drives the action. They claim to be from a parallel universe which has been overrun by a rogue terraforming system that has destroyed their entire universe. They have sent instructions to our world on how to build machinery to let them across.
In The Divide trilogy by Elizabeth Kay (2002–2006), Felix Sanders crosses into a parallel universe where magic and magical beings exist while science and human beings are considered mythical.
 Andrew Crumey's novel Mobius Dick (2004) features a parallel world in which Nazi Germany invaded Britain and Erwin Schrödinger failed to find the quantum theory equation that bears his name. The parallel worlds become connected due to experiments with quantum computers. The same alternate world (in which post-war Britain falls under Communist rule) also appears in his novels Music, in a Foreign Language (1994) and Sputnik Caledonia (2008).
In Darren Shan's Demonata series (2005–2010) a boy can open windows to parallel worlds with his hands. A part of the story also plays in one of these parallel worlds, the Demonata.
 Harry Turtledove's Crosstime Traffic series of books (2003–2008) by Harry Turtledove centers on an Earth that has discovered access to alternate universes where history went differently. "Crosstime Traffic" is the name of the company with a global monopoly on the technology.Pet Force, a series of children's books by Jim Davis and a spinoff of Garfield, one of his comic strips. The series contains five novels and takes place in a parallel universe and features alternate versions of the comic strip's main characters.
 Michael Crichton's Timeline (1999) tells the story of historians who travel to the Middle Ages to save a friend of theirs who already traveled back in time before them. The book follows in Crichton's long history of combining technical details and action in his books, addressing quantum physics and time travel. The time travel mechanism incorporates the concept of the multiverse.
 Greg Egan's Diaspora is a novel about sentient software intelligences living inside computer "polises" who undertake expeditions throughout the multiverse.
 Alan Dean Foster's Spellsinger series concerns a 20th-century college student who finds himself transported to a world populated by sentient animals and featuring magic, which he learns how to perform himself through a guitar-like instrument.
 Alan Dean Foster's Parallelities is a novel about a tabloid reporter whose interview subject inadvertently infects him with a condition making him shift between alternate versions of Los Angeles seemingly at random.
 Three of Jack Womack's "Dryco" novels, Terraplane, Elvissey, and Going, Going, Gone, concern an "evil" parallel universe which is also chronologically shifted about fifty years into our past, in which among other things, slavery wasn't abolished until the 20th century, the US government commits genocide in the 1940s and Elvis Presley is a psychopath.
 Micheal Buckley's N.E.R.D.S: The Cheerleaders of Doom features thousands of alternate realities in which the main characters form an army from.
 Richard Bach's One (2001) is a novel where Bach and his wife Leslie are catapulted into an alternate world, one in which they exist simultaneously in many different incarnations.
The protagonist of Roger Zelazny's Chronicles of Amber belongs to a royal family of magician-types who can alter details of the world around them at will. These alterations are known as "walking in Shadow". The farther the desired Shadow-world lies from one's present reality, the more details need to be changed and the longer the walk.
 Stephen Lawhead's Song of Albion trilogy (published in 1991) tells the tale of a pair of university students who stumble into an alternate world (Albion).
The conceit of Charles Stross's Merchant Princes series is that the ability to travel between worlds is a recessive trait possessed by a clan of narcotics runners from a medieval world. They travel to an alternate present where the northeast coast of North America has been settled by Norsemen.Dark Matter by Blake Crouch (2016)
 Daedalus Howell's Quantum Deadline (published in 2015) finds a reporter helping a boy who claims to be from a parallel universe return using an Easter Egg hidden in a popular mobile phone game. To complicate matters, the name of the reporter is also "Daedalus Howell" and a preface to the book reads "Based on a true story. Somewhere..." making the novel itself something of an alternate reality. (FMRL)
 Road to Eugenica by A.M. Rose is a novel where the main character Drea is actually from another dimension on Earth named Eugenica.
Kristen Cashore's Jane Unlimited (published in 2017), contains many genres. In one section, protagonist Jane experiences the multiverse hinted at throughout the book.
Overstrike by C. M. Angus (published in 2020) features high-functioning schizophrenics with the ability to simultaneously perceive multiple realities.
James S. Peet's Corps of Discovery Series is set in the multiverse and follows the adventures of Corps of Discovery Explorer Bill Clark as he and fellow Explorers navigate between parallel Earths. The series consists of three books to date, Surveyor (published in 2017), Trekker (published in 2018), and Explorer (published in 2020). The Hayek Chronicles series is set in the same timeline as the Corps of Discovery Series, but it's from the point where the portal to parallel Earths is first discovered. There is only one book in the series to date, Openings (published in 2022).

Feature filmsSpider-Man: Beyond the Spider-Verse (2024)The Flash (2023)Spider-Man: Across the Spider-Verse (2023)Night of the Coconut (2022): a video essayist travels to a parallel dimension with a clout hungry coconut who has aspirations of multiversal domination.Doctor Strange in the Multiverse of Madness (2022)Everything Everywhere All At Once (2022)Spider-Man: No Way Home (2021)Venom: Let There Be Carnage (2021)Isn't It Romantic (2019)Avengers: Endgame (2019)Yesterday (2019)Love at Second Sight (2019): French film depicting the story of Raphaël and Olivia who fall in love with each over. But, after a huge argument, Raphaël wakes up in a parallel word in which he has never met Olivia.Spider-Man: Into the Spider-Verse (2018)Deadpool 2 (2018)The Cloverfield Paradox (2018)Parallel (2018)Parallels (2015)Tomorrowland (2015)Time Lapse (2014)Edge of Tomorrow (2014)X-Men: Days of Future Past (2014)Irandaam ulagam (2013)My Little Pony Equestria Girls (2013)Coherence (2013)Source Code (2011)Another Earth (2011)Phineas and Ferb the Movie: Across the 2nd Dimension (2011)Shrek Forever After (2010)Maximum Shame (2010)Paradox (2010)Justice League: Crisis on Two Earths (2010)Turtles Forever (2009)Garfield's Pet Force (2009): Based on the children's book series, which takes place in a parallel universe and stars alternate versions of the main characters of the Garfield comic strips.Star Trek (2009)Mr. Nobody (2009)Next (2007)The Mist (2007)The Golden Compass (2007)Déjà Vu (2006)The Butterfly Effect (2004)Webs (2003): A group of electricians find a machine in an abandoned building that can create a portal to a parallel Earth that has been overrun by giant spiders.The One (2001): Travel between parallel universes in the Multiverse is possible by using "quantum tunnelling" technology, but restricted and policed by the Multiverse Authority (MVA). Alternate versions or "Multiverse Counterparts" (MVCs) of all living persons are connected by an "energy string." Gabriel Yu-Law, a rogue, former MVA agent learns that killing alternate versions of himself in parallel universes divides the "energy" among the surviving MVC's and subsequently embarks on a mission to kill all of his MVC's in order to gain ultimate power and become "The One." He travels to what appears to be our universe to kill his last remaining MVC, Gabriel Law. The task becomes exceedingly more difficult as Law realizes that the energy he shares with Yu-Law has given them both super-human strength and agility.Donnie Darko (2001)
Oshikiri (2000)The Family Man (2000)Escaflowne, 2000 : Based on the anime Escaflowne features a girl who doesn't fit in. She is soon magically sent to the land of Guya where she is to help a prince gain access to the legendary Escaflowne in order for him to avenge his destroyed homeland.Pokémon 3: The Movie (2000)Run Lola Run (1998)Sliding Doors (1998)The Lake (1998): The natives of a small town discover that they are slowly being replaced by that counterparts from a parallel Earth.Crossworlds (1996)Fatherland (1994): "Based on the book of Robert Harris. Hitler won the war against the Western allies but the war against the Soviet Union is still raging on. It is 1964, the 75th birthday of the Führer..."Doorways (1993)Super Mario Bros. (1993)Julia and Julia (1987)
 Prisoners of the Lost Universe (1983)The Stranger (1973)Doppelgänger (AKA Journey to the Far Side of the Sun, 1969)Last Action Hero (1993)The NeverEnding Story (film) (1984)Enchanted (film) (2007)Justice League: The Flashpoint ParadoxBack to the Future Part IIInjustice (2021 film)Justice League: Gods and MonstersJustice Society: World War IITelevision
 Sonic Prime sends Sonic the Hedgehog into the "Shatterverse", a multiverse created by Sonic shattering the Paradox Prism, containing several "Shatterspaces", alternate versions of Sonic's world.
 What If...? (2021 – present) explores various realities within the Multiverse that diverged from the main timeline of the Marvel Cinematic Universe (MCU), presented as variations of the events seen in mainline MCU entries.Loki (2021 – present) follows an alternate version of Loki and other variants of himself as they journey across time into the past and future, while evading a bureaucratic agency that aims to maintain the stability of time.Dark (2017 – 2020) involves time and parallel worlds.
 Counterpart, TV series 2017 – 2019, in which a parallel Earth was created in 1987 during an experiment by East German scientists: the protagonist works for an organization that communicates between the universes.
 Stranger Things (2016 – present) features an alternate dimension called the Upside Down which is a dark version of the fictional town of Hawkins, Indiana filled with monsters and connected by a hive mind. 
 The Flash (2014 – present) features many alternate universes after a singularity allowing multiversal travel opens in the finale of the first season. The multiverse is ultimately destroyed in the Crisis on Infinite Earths Arrowverse crossover, and reborn as a new multiverse connecting most DC television series, as well as the DC Extended Universe.
 Lost in Austen (2008): A woman from modern London enters the world of the Jane Austen novel Pride and Prejudice through a portal in her bathroom.
 The Twilight Zones 1963 episode "The Parallel" was one of the earliest examples of parallel universes as a key plot element on American television.
 The Babylon 5 television movie Thirdspace involves the discovery of an alternate universe.
 Dark Shadows, the 1960s fantasy/horror soap opera, introduced the concept of "parallel time" when the main character, Barnabas, witnesses unexplainable changes in a closed off part of his family's house. During one of these changes, he becomes trapped for a time in a parallel world.
 Star Trek featured the recurring mirror universe, a dark reflection of the normal universe in which the regular characters are twisted, self-serving and more than willing to resort to torture and murder to achieve their goals. The mirror universe was introduced in the original Star Trek, and it also appeared in Enterprise, but was featured most often in Deep Space Nine. Other Star Trek episodes featuring parallel universes outside the Mirror Universe include "Parallels" and "The Alternative Factor".
 His Dark Materials (2019 – present) deals with two children who explore multiple different parallel universes, including a version of our own.
 Doctor Who occasionally featured parallel worlds. Examples include "Inferno" (1970), where Great Britain has been a republic since at least 1943 (the Royal Family having been executed after a military coup) and is ruled by a totalitarian regime led by a figure reminiscent of Oswald Mosley who uses the title of "the Leader". The 1980–1981 "E-space" trilogy of episodes ("Full Circle", "State of Decay", and "Warriors' Gate"). The second series of the 2005 revival of the show made frequent use of the concept beginning with "Rise of the Cybermen" and "The Age of Steel", postulating a parallel world with yet another Republic of Great Britain, Zeppelins filling the sky, and an alternate race of Cybermen are created. Since the Time War, travel between parallel universes is supposedly near-impossible, but a breach between the universes makes frequent visits easy in the second series finale "Army of Ghosts"/"Doomsday". These visits cause increasing damage to the universes and the breach is permanently sealed.
 Sliders dealt with a group of mostly-unwilling travellers who ended up "sliding" between various parallel Earths in an attempt to find their way back to their own universe. Plots included an Earth in which the population is controlled through a lottery, an Earth where most of the males were killed by germ warfare, an Earth where dinosaurs are still alive, and an Earth in which the population have been turned into flesh-eating zombies. According to a main character Quinn, there were an infinite number of universes where different single decisions were different and even a world where the Earth formed differently and rotated around the Sun slower, slowing down that timeline.
 Futurama has included some parallel universe episodes like "I Dated a Robot" which features a universe where everyone's a cowboy/girl and "The Farnsworth Parabox" features boxes which hold a variety of universes inside them.
 Spellbinder series is about a group of teenagers who discover a gateway to a parallel universe, in which one of them becomes trapped. Its sequel "Spellbinder: Land of the Dragon Lord" features some of the same characters, who now have a trans dimensional "boat" with they use to travel between worlds.
 Parallax is about a boy named Ben, who discovers a portal to multiple universes, and explores them with his friends: Francis, Melinda, Una, Due, Tiffany and Mundi as well as newfound sister, Katherine.
 Stargate television franchise (Stargate SG-1, Stargate Atlantis and Stargate Universe) have had several episodes dealing with parallel universes. The first had Daniel Jackson finding a mirror looking device, known as the Quantum Mirror, where by touching the "mirror" he was taken to a parallel universe in which things hadn't gone so well compared to his reality. Another episode has a Samantha Carter and a character killed off in the second episode of the show come through the mirror to request help from the show's normal reality. With the end of that show the Quantum Mirror was destroyed. The next episode, "Ripple Effect", dealing with alternate realities has a lot of different SG1 teams coming through the same Gate. The latest episode, "The Road Not Taken", had Samantha Carter travel to an alternate reality where martial law was in effect.
 Buffy the Vampire Slayer and Angel have featured both parallel universes, such as Pylea, and alternate realities, such as one where most of the regular cast were either dead or vampires. Also mentioned, but never seen, is the hypothetical World Without Shrimp and the confirmed-real World With Nothing But Shrimp. Episodes of this type include "Doppelgangland" and "The Wish."
 Charmed, there exists an alternate dimension where all the evil are good and all the good are evil. The reason for this given that there has to be balance in the universe, so there can never be an area where everything is all good and one where it is all bad as this would affect the grand design of life. So for every good thing that the Charmed Ones do for good in this world, it is done for evil in another to keep things balanced. Mostly, everything occurs exactly the same way, mirroring the real world. Some differences are that all Whitelighters are Darklighters and vice versa, and that The Underworld is a Garden of Eden-like paradise. The Demon of Fear is the Demon of Hope, and Wyatt Halliwell faces a future in which he turns good one day as opposed to one where he turns evil. Some figures, such as the morally ambiguous Gideon, remain largely similar.
 The Jimmy Timmy Power Hour, the main characters move back and forth from the respective universes of The Fairly OddParents and The Adventures of Jimmy Neutron: Boy Genius.
 In Smallville episode "Reckoning", Lana Lang is killed in a car crash while being chased by Lex Luthor. Clark Kent journeys to his Fortress of Solitude where he uses a Kryptonian crystal to go back in time and save Lana (creating an alternate timeline to the original events); however the universe 'finds a balance' and Clark's father Jonathan Kent dies instead. More recently, the season 10 episode "Luthor" explores a world where Clark was discovered by Lionel Luthor rather than Jonathan and Martha Kent.
 Charlie Jade describes three parallel universes: Alphaverse, Betaverse, and Gammaverse.
 Red Dwarf offers several humorous takes on the concept that don't involve an evil twin joke, including one episode where women are the dominant gender (Nellie Armstrong was the first person on the moon, and Wilma Shakespeare wrote great plays such as Rachel III and The Taming of the Shrimp), and another where Arnold Rimmer becomes the far more dashing and debonair Ace Rimmer.
 Kamen Rider Decade, the Japanese tokusatsu show, features ten parallel worlds, nine of which feature alternate versions of Kamen Riders from 2000–2008.
 In The O.C. episode "The Chrismukkah-huh?", Taylor Townsend and Ryan Atwood venture into a parallel universe in which they never existed, in order to set things straight to get back to their own world.
 Fringe has a recurring subplot in its first season about a terrorist group called ZFT who seek to prepare 'warriors' for a coming conflict between parallel universes. The final two episodes of the season deal with recurring villain David Robert Jones attempting to travel into a parallel universe in order to kill the mysterious William Bell. Series protagonist Olivia Dunham experiences visions of this other world before traveling there and meeting Bell in the South Tower of the World Trade Center. Background details show that in this universe, the White House was destroyed in the 9/11 attacks rather than the Twin Towers. In season 2 the main plot is manage to stop warriors from the other side, the shape-shifters. At the end of the season, the three main characters cross to this parallel universe. A character from the other side attempt to create a machine to destroy our universe, in order to save his own world. The main character, Olivia, remains trapped in the parallel universe by the end. In season 3, in odd-numbered episodes the episode takes place with Olivia, in the parallel world, while the other characters are in even-numbered episodes. In episode 8, the two story arcs collide, resulting with the end of the appearance of the parallel universe, but the upcoming war remains.
 The miniseries The 10th Kingdom concerns a parallel world in which the fairy tales of Grimm are historical events.An Englishman's CastleThe X-Files episode "4-D"The Day After TomorrowThe Justice League episode "Justice Lords"AwakeThe Community episode "Remedial Chaos Theory"
The Hercules: The Legendary Journeys episode "Stranger in a Strange World"
The Psych episode "Right Turn or Left for Dead"
Rick and Morty is a television show, provided by Adult Swim, that involves many different parallel universes. A majority of these universes are shown in the second season.Supernatural In season 6, the protagonists Sam and Dean Winchester travel to another universe where they are actors on a TV show called Supernatural. Throughout season 13, a major plotline centers around a parallel universe known as Apocalypse World, a dark post-apocalyptic wasteland where Sam and Dean never existed and thus could not save the world. In the same season, another universe called The Bad Place is introduced which appears to be mainly inhabited by monsters that are different than what is in the Winchesters' world. This particular universe appeared in the backdoor pilot to the proposed spin-off series Supernatural: Wayward Sisters.
The City and the City (TV series) 
Ben 10: Omniverse: In the final half of the series, Vilgax forges an alliance with several evil alternate versions of Ben Tennyson. Ben actually visits one of them in the two parter "It's a Mad, Mad, Mad Ben World", where the world underwent an apocalyptic event a la Mad Max, and the Ben of this timeline became a ruthless dictator.
If I Hadn't Met You (2018)
The Man in the High Castle
The Magic Trolls and the Troll Warriors, Siegfried said that the magic trolls world was connected to Princess Celia's world.
Once Upon a Time (TV series)
Mia and Me
Time Jam: Valerian & Laureline
The Loud House (episode : "One of the Boys" & "Time Trap!")
Justice League (TV series) (Savage Time & A Better World & Legend)
The Real Ghostbusters (Xmas Marks the Spot)
Hot Wheels Battle Force 5 (Double Down)
Codename: Kids Next Door (Operation: P.O.O.L.)
Superman: The Animated Series (Brave New Metropolis)
Danger Mouse (2015 TV series) (With counterpart Sinister Mouse, Baron Penfold and Silas von Greenback are Danger Toad)

Anime
Isekai is a particular genre of anime where the main character is transported into another world. Although sometimes this is a virtual reality, most commonly it consists of parallel universes, especially fantasy worlds. There are a few examples in the list below.

 Black Rock Shooter while each piece of media takes place in its own universe, they each focus around Black Rock Shooter, a mysterious black haired girl who possesses a burning blue eye and a powerful cannon that can shoot rocks at high speed. Other characters also appear in more than one form of media. The OVA focuses on a girl named Mato Kuroi, who befriends another girl, Yomi Takanashi, upon entering school. As the two start to drift apart, with Yomi becoming jealous of Mato's friendship with Yuu Kotari, Yomi suddenly disappears. As Mato searches for her, she is taken to a strange world where she meets the mysterious Black Rock Shooter, who merges with her and helps her search for Yomi, fighting off the evil Dead Master who possessed her. The television series uses the same characters from the OVA in a similar but slightly different storyline. As Mato enters middle school and becomes friends with Yomi, she soon faces personal troubles and the influence caused by another world where Black Rock Shooter fights other girls.
 Amagami SS follows protagonist Junichi as every few episodes moves to an alternate timeline in which Junichi makes different decisions resulting in ending up with a different girlfriend.
 Digimon features an alternative perceived reality called the Digital World. The Digital World is created as a result of the Earth's electronic network, with everything being made up of data instead of matter. Also, certain seasons, games, and manga are set in a different parallel Earth, with its own version of a Digital World. In the second season of the series a third world was introduced near the series finale; this world was a place where the wishes and desires of the Digidestined came true, only for their ideal realities to be shattered after coming to the realization they're not real.
 Dragon Ball, there exists an alternate future timeline where the protagonist, Goku, dies of a heart disease, and without Goku to defend it, the Earth falls victim to a pair of androids who attack the Earth six months later and kill all other warriors who come to its defense. The character Trunks, who lives in the terrible destruction of Earth in this timeline, travels back in time to warn Goku about his disease and to warn him about the androids. As a result of this, in the "standard" timeline, Goku never dies of the disease, and the warriors never die in battle with the androids. Also resulting from this is that there are two versions of the character Trunks – the one from the alternate future, and the one from the standard, or altered, timeline. Dragon Ball Super later reveals the existence of twelve parallel universes, and that each timeline has its own set of these universes. The universes are numbered from one to twelve, and are in matching pairs, with each pair's numbers adding up to thirteen. Goku's universe is Universe 7, which is matched with Universe 6. Grand Zen'o, the Omni-King, eventually decides to arrange a massive battle royal tournament between eight of the universes, in which the losing universes will be erased from existence.
 Dual! Parallel Trouble Adventure is based on two parallel universes that formed from a critical choice made in the past (each came from the assumption of one of two possible choices) and revolves around a protagonist able to see and later travel from one universe to the other.
"Higurashi no Naku Koro ni"
 Rockman EXE Beast involves another dimension parallel to Earth named Beyondard, in which there are parallel versions of the characters in the world, where a war between the antagonists Falzer and Greiga are fighting over control, as well as the Synchronizer, Trill. Many Navis from Earth are in this world serving as the lower antagonists for the series, preferring to be called 'Zoanaroids' (strangely, many of the Zoanaroids were already deleted on Earth—a concept used by Fullmetal Alchemist: Conqueror of Shamballa), then their real name. These Navis had special forms that gave them increased strength and an altered appearance. In this world, a Navi could be materialized within Beyondard without the need of a dimensional area, due to its strange environment caused by an accident. The environment would also cause those using Cross Fusion pain while merged.
 Neon Genesis Evangelion, the final episode of the series presents the main character Shinji Ikari with an alternate universe, wherein the cataclysmic event Second Impact had not occurred and all the main characters live peaceful lives. This universe went on to be the basis for numerous spin-off series, including Neon Genesis Evangelion: Angelic Days. It is also stated in the episode that this universe was just one of many possible alternate universes.
 Noein is a story comprising both parallel universes and temporal juxtapositions; space and time are distorted (and the perception of such becomes vague), and past and future versions of characters (from different realities) co-exist in the same dimension.Sonic the Hedgehog, this parallel universe is called "Planet Freedom", which is split into two distinct realms: the Land of the Sky and the Land of Darkness. The Land of the Sky consists of an unknown number of continents that drift high in the stratosphere of the planet, all of them connected to a massive ice formation which also serves to anchor them to the planet's surface below. According to Knuckles, if this ice network was destroyed, Planet Freedom's rotation would hurl the Land of the Sky into outer space, undoubtedly killing everyone on it. The Land of Darkness is the actual surface of Planet Freedom, a post-apocalyptic wilderness with Robotnik as its sole living inhabitant. The Land of Darkness can only be accessed in one of two ways: by a whirlwind-like "portal" in the Land of the Sky, or via a warp zone, an extradimensional link between two points on Planet Freedom. Most of its terrain is untamed and mountainous, but a crumbling city serves as the location of Robotnik's empire. The city and terrain strongly imply that Planet Freedom is a post-apocalyptic Earth that was built upon with floating islands, with certain landmarks suggesting that the ruins are those of New York City.Sonic X , there is two difference of parallel universe, Sonic's world and the world of humans, during Sonic's battle against his arch-enemy Doctor Eggman he crosses time and space and ends up in the human world along with his friend's Tails, Amy, Knuckles, and Cream and Cheese, and there are other characters who appear along with them, Rouge, Chaotix, Big and his frog friend named Froggy, and other non-anthropomorphic animals from Sonic's world. Sonic meets a 12-year-old boy named Christopher Thorndyke who befriended Sonic and helps him and his friends to stop Eggman from getting hands-on Chaos Emeralds and stopping him frequently from taking over the human world while gathering the Chaos Emeralds which were the only key for Sonic and his friends to return back to their world.
 The Disappearance of Haruhi Suzumiya, a tie-in movie to the anime adaptation of The Melancholy of Haruhi Suzumiya light novels, features the world being altered by Yuki Nagato so that the main characters who possess supernatural abilities are ordinary humans, with protagonist Kyon being the only person who was affected by the alteration.
 Spider Riders (Kid Friendly): when a boy is transported to another world he soon finds out its filled with hero spider riders and he soon gets his own.
 Clannad: After Story, during the final episode where protagonist Tomoya is sent to an alternate universe where his wife Nagisa, and daughter Ushio have not died.
 Outbreak Company mainly is about a shut-in otaku from Japan being sent to a magical alternate universe newly discovered by the Japanese government, in means to spread Japanese culture across the lands of the new world.
 Tsubasa: RESERVoir CHRoNiCLE centers on a group of characters traveling through a multitude of alternate realities—essentially parallel universes—on a quest to restore someone's memories.
 The Familiar of Zero focuses on a human boy on Earth being accidentally sent to a magical world, by a spell. It is mentioned several times that others have traveled between the two universes through a portal from an annual solar eclipse.
 Bakugan Battle Brawlers Inuyasha is a manga and anime about a young girl that travels back in time to a world full of demons and monsters by falling into a well. There, she meets a half-demon called Inuyasha.Fullmetal Alchemist: Conqueror of Shamballa depicts two worlds: our world, which is well on its way to WWII, and the world of alchemy where a majority of the series' events take place.
 Fairy Tail features a story arc in which guild members travel to a parallel world called Edolas which is devoid of the magic they are used to.
 Steins;Gate Multiple scenarios depending upon player's actions.
 Vision of Escaflowne A girl is accidentally taken to the land of Guya when a prince on a dragon hunt, so he can awaken the legendary mecha Escaflowne, arrives in our world. After defeating the dragon they are both sent back to Guya where adventure soon occurs after the prince's land is destroyed by our villains.Isekai Izakaya "Nobu" An izakaya was opened for customers from the parallel worlds that serves drinks and food.Naruto the Movie: Road to Ninja Naruto and Sakura was teleported to an alternate world, in which the situation are in reverse, like Hinata developed an aggressive nature, Kiba loves cats, Neji's a pervert, Sasuke's a lady's man, Kushina and Minato are alive and Sakura's parents are dead, Tenten are clumsy and among others. They must fight Menma, Naruto's alternate.Restaurant to Another World a Western Restaurant was serving people from another world every Saturday via a magical warped door.Death March to the Parallel World Rhapsody The protagonist became stuck on the game he managed.The Girl in Twilight, known in Japan as Akanesasu Shoujo explores the ideas of parallel worlds when the main group of protagonists accidentally stumble upon them and meet their parallel counterparts.Gate (novel series)Radio
 Fifth Dimension is a radio drama adaptation of the short story, "The Plattner Story" by H. G. Wells. A chemistry teacher is accidentally thrust into a parallel world with alien inhabitants. The regular world continues to be visible, though translucent and intangible.Undone is a radio comedy based on the idea of parallel versions of London, in particular "Undone". Undone is seen as a place where weirdness is normal, while mundaneness is normal in London, with some "Leakage" between the two. There is also a third version called "Donlon", a more mundane version of London in which everything is generic.Married is a radio comedy with science fiction themes that first aired in 1999. Robin is happily single when he wakes up in a parallel universe, with a wife and kids.

Comics

Alternate/parallel universes are often used as an explanation for crossovers between different comic companies' characters.

 The Adventures of Luther Arkwright is based around the concept of parallel universes.
 Various alternate universes in Archie Comics.
 Bokurano: Ours features parallel universes being pitted against each other in giant mecha battles in which the losers' universes are destroyed.
 Bucky O'Hare, the science-fiction series is set in a parallel universe known as the Aniverse, where all inhabitants are anthropomorphic animals.
 Caste of the Metabarons features two wars between our universe and alternate ones.
 The DC Comics Multiverse features parallel universes such as Earth-One, Earth-Two, the Elseworlds, and other such worlds. DC Comics has had four major events, the Crisis on Infinite Earths, Infinite Crisis, Final Crisis, Dark Nights: Metal, Dark Nights: Death Metal, and Dark Crisis on Infinite Earths which all heavily revolved around the alternate universes in the DC Multiverse. Although the Multiverse was officially destroyed during the Crisis on Infinite Earths, DC continued to publish a number of non-continuity stories under the Elseworlds banner, telling stories of DC characters in universes with significant differences from the main DC continuity. For example, Superman: Red Son depicted a world where Superman's spaceship landed not in Kansas, but in the Soviet Union.
 The Marvel Comics Multiverse features parallel universes such as the Age of Apocalypse, Femizonia, and all the alternate realities of the What If series, among many others. Exiles details the adventures of a dimension-hopping band of superheroes from other alternate universes in the Marvel Multiverse.
 Homestuck is an online web-comic centered around four kids who play a game named Sburb that brings them to an alternate dimension known as the Incipisphere, where a war is fought between two planets, Derse and Prospit. Further events reveal another universe inhabited by trolls, who also play a similar game.
 Jenny Everywhere is an open source webcomic character, being able to 'shift' between realities. Each universe has its own Jenny Everywhere, so she is literally everywhere (that implies other living persons being solely unique). In some stories Everywheres from different universes will meet each other.
 Jinty published Worlds Apart in 1981. Six girls find their dream worlds becoming reality after being knocked out by a mysterious gas. Each world is ruled by the respective characteristic that sets each girl apart: greed, sports-mania, vanity, crime, intellectualism, and fear.
JoJo's Bizarre Adventure's parts 7 and 8, titled Steel Ball Run and JoJolion respectively, exist in a different, alternate universe than parts 1-6.
 L'enfant penchée, the main character in François Schuiten and Benoît Peeters' comic book, lives on our Earth, but comes from a parallel universe. She is attached to this other universe's gravitational pull and therefore stands inclined.
 Misty published The Sentinels in 1978, whereby two apartment blocks called "The Sentinels" connect the mainstream universe with an alternate reality where the Nazis conquered Britain in 1940. The connection had people stumbling in from both universes, causing terror over mysterious disappearances and mix-ups over parallel world doubles. This culminated in the Gestapo unwittingly arresting a man from the mainstream universe and forces from both universes uniting for a rescue mission.Reborn! Skobek Universe, which houses Toadafrog from Green Frog Studios's comics, which is connected to the actual universe through a wormhole, which is how countries like Korea, Greenland, humans, and concepts such as rock music, classical music, baseball, and the cinema come from.
 Sonic the Hedgehog comic, the Archie version features a multitude of parallel universes, the most prominent ones being the No Zone universe, where Zone cops monitor all activity within the other universes, and the Anti-Universe (AKA "Moebius"), home to Sonic's evil doppelganger Scourge the Hedgehog
 Yu-Gi-Oh!s English version, "Shadow Games" happen in an alternate reality known as the "Shadow Realm".
 Zenith: Phase Three, superheroes from many parallel universes must band together to defend their worlds.
 +Anima by Natsumi Mukai is about four anthropomorphic characters; outcasts who are searching for others of their kind. Despite its popularity, the manga ended on its tenth volume.
 Le Cycle de Taï-Dor are a french comics in heroic fantasy with a mirror magic in another world.
 Flashpoint (comics)Games

 Dungeons & Dragons role-playing game has a thoroughly developed system of planes of existence. A popular campaign setting for the game, Planescape, centers around travelling between these planes. Ravenloft, a gothic horror setting for Dungeons & Dragons, is based entirely in a single demiplane.
 GURPS Infinite Worlds, a supplement for the Fourth Edition of the GURPS role-playing game, expands upon the campaign setting of conflict between the Infinity Patrol, which is the time-travel agency on "our" Earth, referred to as Homeline, and Centrum across a multiplicity of alternate history Earths. It won the 2005 Origins Award as Best Game Supplement.

Video gamesBack to the Future: The GameBayonetta 3BioShock InfiniteBravely DefaultBuffy the Vampire Slayer: Chaos Bleeds City of Heroes contains a set of levels that include many missions set in parallel universes, including one controlled by Nazis and another with evil versions of the games' well-known iconic heroes.
 Chrono Cross (2000), the main character must travel between two dimensions, known as "Home World" (the world from which the main character originates) and "Another World". This was followed by the similar fan made game Chrono Trigger: Crimson Echoes.
 Crash Twinsanity, the main protagonists (Crash Bandicoot and Doctor Neo Cortex) travel to the mysterious 10th Dimension, where everything that is good in their dimension is evil, and vice versa.Digimon World and Digimon World DSEternal Darkness: Sanity's RequiemEversionFinal Fantasy Tactics A2: Grimoire of the Rift and Final Fantasy Tactics Advance Final Fantasy X, Tidus is transported from his hometown of Zanarkand into Spira, a land where everything is radically different. As the game progresses, he finds that Zanarkand was destroyed 1,000 years before the start of the game, and the Zanarkand he is from is a just a dream created by the Fayth, the souls of those who died when the city perished.
 Final Fantasy XIII-2, in which the actions of the time-travelling protagonists to fix events in the original timeline cause parallel worlds to appear, in which events have change based on their intervention; players can then travel between the old and new timelines, existing in parallel.Freedom ForceGrandia: Parallel TrippersGrowlanser Wayfarer of Time Half-Life series features a number of parallel universes from which both hostile and friendly alien species originate. One inter-dimensional alien race, the Combine, conquers Earth and attempts to harvest and enslave humanity. Only in Half-Life and its expansion packs, however, does the player ever visit one of these parallel dimensions; the so-called 'border world', Xen.Heroes of the Storm The Hyperdimension Neptunia series features several different parallel universes. The entire first game, as well as most of the spin-off titles, take place in different universes from the main continuity. Hyperdimension Neptunia Victory and Megadimension Neptunia VII both have the main characters traveling to other universes.Injustice: Gods Among Us is a fighting video game based upon the fictional universe of DC Comics. The game was developed by NetherRealm Studios and published by Warner Bros. Interactive Entertainment for the PlayStation 3, Xbox 360, and Wii U.Killer InstinctKingdom HeartsLeague of Legends, in the canon, the video game primarily takes place in a continent named Valoran in a world named Runeterra. Normally the back-stories of a few champions state about beings coming from another realm whether summoned or invited by summoners (such as a character based on Anubis named Nasus being pulled from his home planet into Runeterra), or by beings crossing inter-dimensional rifts to arrive in Runeterra (such as void creatures crossing a space anomaly from a lost city named Icathia).Legacy of KainThe Legend of Zelda series include alternate realities: A Link to the Past and The Legend of Zelda: Four Swords Adventures include an alternate "Dark World" along with the normal "light" one, and Majora's Mask is set in a parallel reality of Hyrule, Termina. Other games feature the same world in two different time periods. In Legend of Zelda: Twilight Princess there is a Twilight Realm where Link becomes a Wolf. In Link's Awakening there exists a kind of alternate universe inside the unconscious, dream state mind of the Wind Fish. There is also a parallel universe in Phantom Hourglass simply called the "World of the Ocean King" by the spirits. The Legend of Zelda: A Link Between Worlds involves another parallel version of Hyrule, called Lorule, which has fallen into ruin due to the destruction of their Triforce. When Lorule invades Hyrule in an attempt to steal the Triforce to replace their own, Link has to travel back and forth between the two worlds.Lego Dimensions, Lord Vortech torn rifts into all of the LEGO worlds (and drifted the all of the LEGO greats to planet Earth).The Longest Journey features a story about two parallel universes, Stark and Arcadia. Stark is a futuristic universe with cyberpunk influences, while Arcadia is a fantastic medieval world.
 Lost Odyssey, four immortal protagonists, and one immortal antagonist, are sent from a parallel universe in danger of collapse to observe the game universe's residents and return after a millennium (one year in the parallel universe). The antagonist, wishing to retain his immortality, erases the others' memories and plots to destroy the link between the worlds.
 Marathon Infinity, a seemingly unstoppable creature, The W'rkncacnter, is unleashed, and the player must transport himself to different parallel realities until he finds the one in which he may prevent the release of the creature. In certain levels the player will appear before the release of the creature, and can then attempt to stop it. Every few levels, usually at the end of a chapter, the player would find himself in a surreal "dream world", in which his surroundings had little to no relation to the W'rkncacnter or even his original reality at all. It is suspected that these levels are not universes at all, but in fact a dreaming interlude before the player reaches his actual destination (this is debatable however since the player can be killed in these levels like any other). After the player succeeds in trapping the W'rkncacnter in a gigantic gravitational field, he is "freed" from the control of the artificial intelligences that had previously governed nearly every one of his objectives, and subsequently teleports to another reality, at which point the game ends. It is unknown what reality the player goes to next, but it is assumed that he is using his new freedom to explore various universes at his own leisure.
 Metroid Prime 2: Echoes features the planet Aether, which is struck by a meteor. The strange, energetic substance (called Phazon) within the meteor, along with the force of the impact, split the planet's reality into light and dark dimensions. Samus, the heroine, must travel between the two dimensions, transferring energy back to the light dimension before the two competing worlds destroy one another.
 Mortal Kombat series features a massive war between realities, known as "Realms". This crossed over into the DC Universe in Mortal Kombat vs. DC Universe.
 Myst, a people known as D'ni colonized Earth from another universe, and kept traveling to other universes (known as Ages) through Linking Books. According to their cosmology, each universe is a leaf of the Terokh Jeruth, the Tree of Possibilities. Myst also includes the use of Trap Books as empty universes for storing criminals, although they were later retconned to be complete universes of their own, called Prison Ages.Ni no Kuni ParaWorld is set in a parallel dimension discovered by a group of scientists in the 19th century. This new world is periodically connected to ours via natural gateways. In order to cross into that world, one must predict the exact time and location of the opening rift. ParaWorld is a world where electricity does not and cannot exist, and the word "lightning" is foreign to the natives. As such, technology has not gone beyond steam engines. Most tribes, however, prefer to utilize other means of transportation and warfare – dinosaurs. As discovered by three modern-day scientists who are trapped in ParaWorld, dinosaurs never existed on our Earth, and all the bones found by archaeologists have somehow crossed over through the portals. In ParaWorld, however, they exist alongside human tribes, some of which are similar culturally to ours (e.g. Norsemen, Dustriders (Beduins), and Dragon Clans (East Asia)).RuneScape has a mirror universe named ScapeRune which players can access through certain random events.
 The Silent Hill survival horror video game series incorporates an alternate dimension that is related to characters' emotions, memories and other projections of their subconsciousness.Sonic Chronicles: The Dark Brotherhood, Sonic Rush, and Sonic Rush AdventureSpider-Man: Edge of Time and Spider-Man: Shattered Dimensions Spyro the Dragon series, an evil sorcerer sends all of the inhabitants of the three realms to their Shadow Realm counterparts, leaving the normal realms empty save for Spyro.
 Star Ocean: Till the End of Time, the characters unknowingly live in a "video game" created by people in another universe called 4D Space. Eventually, the creators of the game see fit to reboot the game server, effectively destroying the universe in the process, however, once the process is complete, the characters find the universe as they know it intact, and all links to 4D space inaccessible. Suggesting that by destroying the universe, contact between the two planes of existence was severed, without resulting in the destruction of either plane.Star Trek: Shattered UniverseSuper Paper MarioSuper Smash Bros. series
 Tales of Symphonia, the two world exist next to each other without knowing of the other's existence. The two worlds unconsciously battle for control of the energy the worlds share, something like Metroid Prime 2: Echoes, except in that game, the two sides of the war know of each other's existence and the energy they must share.
 Ultima Online used the parallel universe concept to rationalize the existence of multiple instances of the game world (called "shards"), so that players could be partitioned onto multiple servers for capacity reasons.
 UniverseSuper Robot Taisen: Original GenerationZero Escape seriesBermuda SyndromeHeart of Darkness (video game)''

See also
 Parallel universes in fiction
 Multiverse
 Alternate future
 Alternate history (fiction)
 Alternate universe (fan fiction)
 Fantasy world
 Fictional universe
 Imaginary world
 Simulated reality in fiction

Related lists
 List of fictional universes
 List of fictional timelines

References

Science fiction lists
Parallel universes